= Sakaina =

Scientific classification
- Kingdom: Animalia
- Phylum: Arthropoda
- Clade: Pancrustacea
- Class: Malacostraca
- Order: Decapoda
- Suborder: Pleocyemata
- Infraorder: Brachyura
- Family: Parapinnixidae
- Genus: Sakaina; Serène, 1964

Genus of crabs

Sakaina is a genus of pea crabs in the family Parapinnixidae. There are about seven described species in Sakaina.

== Species ==
These seven species belong to the genus Sakaina:

- Sakaina asiatica (Sakai, 1933)
- Sakaina glabra Jiang & Liu, 2011
- Sakaina granulata Jiang & Liu, 2011
- Sakaina incisa Sakai, 1969
- Sakaina japonica Serène, 1964
- Sakaina koreensis Kim & Sakai, 1972
- Sakaina yokoyai (Glassell, 1933)
